The Meriwether is a pair of condominium towers in Portland, Oregon's South Waterfront district, in the United States, which were completed in 2006.  They are named in honor of noted explorer Meriwether Lewis.

See also

 List of tallest buildings in Portland, Oregon

References

External links

 The Meriwether, East Building at Emporis
 The Meriwether, West Building at Emporis

2006 establishments in Oregon
Residential buildings completed in 2006
Residential condominiums in the United States
Residential skyscrapers in Portland, Oregon
South Portland, Portland, Oregon